Tromsø is a municipality in Troms og Finnmark county, Norway. The administrative centre of the municipality is the city of Tromsø.

Tromsø lies in Northern Norway. The  municipality is the 21st largest by area out of the 356 municipalities in Norway. With a population of 77,544, Tromsø is the 12th most populous municipality in Norway. It is the largest urban area in Northern Norway and the third largest north of the Arctic Circle anywhere in the world (following Murmansk and Norilsk). The city center of Tromsø is located on the island of Tromsøya, but the urban area also encompasses part of the nearby mainland and part of the island Kvaløya. Tromsøya is connected to the mainland by the Tromsø Bridge and the Tromsøysund Tunnel, and to the island of Kvaløya by the Sandnessund Bridge.

The municipality is milder than most settlements on the same latitude, due to the effect of the westerlies reaching this far north, as well as the North Atlantic Drift, a branch of the Gulf Stream. Tromsø's latitude of just below 70°N renders annual midnight sun and polar night depending on the season.

The city centre contains the highest number of old wooden houses in Northern Norway, the oldest dating from 1789. Tromsø is a cultural hub for the region, with several festivals taking place in the summer. Due to its location, many countries used to have consulates or missions in Tromsø in the 1990s.

Names and etymology

The city of Tromsø is named after the island of Tromsøya, on which it stands. The last element of the city's name comes from 'island', but the etymology of the first element is uncertain. Several theories exist. One theory holds "Troms-" to derive from the old (uncompounded) name of the island (Old Norse: Trums). Several islands and rivers in Norway have the name Tromsa, and the names of these are probably derived from the word straumr which means "(strong) current." (The original form must then have been Strums, for the missing s, see Indo-European s-mobile.) Another theory holds that Tromsøya was originally called Lille Tromsøya (Little Tromsøya), because of its proximity to the much bigger island today called Kvaløya, that according to this theory was earlier called "Store Tromsøya" due to a characteristic mountain known as Tromma (the Drum). The mountain's name in Sámi, Rumbbučohkka, is identical in meaning, and it is said to have been a sacred mountain for the Sámi in pre-Christian times.

The Sámi name of the island, Romsa, is assumed to be a loan from Norse - but according to the phonetical rules of the Sami language, the frontal t has disappeared from the name. However, an alternative form - Tromsa - is in informal use. There is a theory that holds the Norwegian name of Tromsø derives from the Sámi name, though this theory lacks an explanation for the meaning of Romsa. A common misunderstanding is that Tromsø's Sámi name is Romssa with a double "s". This, however, is the accusative and genitive form of the noun used when, for example, writing "Tromsø Municipality" (Romssa Suohkan). In Finnish, however, the word is written with a double "s": Tromssa.

History
The area has been inhabited since the end of the ice age. Archeological excavations in Tønsvika, just outside the city limits, have turned up artifacts and remains of buildings estimated to be 9,000 to 10,000 years old.

Middle Ages: a fortress on the frontier

The area's rich Norse and Sámi heritage is well documented. The Norse chieftain Ohthere, who lived during the 890s, is assumed to have inhabited the southernmost reaches of today's Tromsø municipality. He described himself as living "furthest to the North of all Norwegians" with areas north of this being populated by Sámi. An Icelandic source (Rimbegla) from the 12th century also describes the fjord Malangen in the south of today's Tromsø municipality as a border between Norse and Sámi coastal settlements during that part of the Middle Ages, however, Archaeological finds show that the Vikings have been present on the main island itself. In a burial/settlement near today's airport, a sword and other combat tools have been found, as well as household tools typical for the Norwegians  In addition, one of Northern Norway's largest Viking treasures is found on the island itself. There has also been extensive Sámi settlement on the coast south of this 'border' as well as scattered Norse settlements north of Malangen—for example, both Sámi and Norse Iron Age (0–1050 AD) remains have been found on southern Kvaløya.

The first church on the island of Tromsøya was erected in 1252. Ecclesia Sanctae Mariae de Trums juxta paganos ("The Church of Saint Mary in Troms near the Heathens"—the nominal "heathens" being the Sámi), was built during the reign of King Hákon Hákonarson. At the time, it was the northernmost church in the world. Around the same time a turf rampart was built to protect the area against raids from Karelia and Russia.

Tromsø was not just a Norwegian outpost in an area mainly populated by the Sámi, but also a frontier city towards Russia; the Novgorod state had the right to tax the Sámi along the coast to Lyngstuva and inland to the Skibotn River or possibly the Målselv River, whereas Norway was allowed to tax areas east to - and including - the Kola Peninsula. During the next five hundred years Norway's border with Russia and the limits of Norwegian settlement would be pushed eastwards to Sør-Varanger, making Tromsø lose its character as a "frontier town".

1700s and 1800s: the "Paris of the north"
During the 17th century, while Denmark–Norway was solidifying its claim to the northern coast of Scandinavia, the redoubt Skansen was built. Despite only being home to around 80 people, Tromsø was issued its city charter on 20 June 1794 by King Christian VII. This coincided with, and was a direct consequence of, the abolition of the city of Bergen's centuries-old monopoly on the trade in cod. Tromsø quickly rose in importance. The Diocese of Hålogaland was created in 1804, with the first bishop being Mathias Bonsak Krogh. The city was established as a municipality 1 January 1838 (see formannskapsdistrikt law).

Arctic hunting, from Novaya Zemlya to Canada, started up around 1820. By 1850, Tromsø was the major centre of Arctic hunting, overtaking the former centre of Hammerfest, and the city was trading from Arkhangelsk to Bordeaux. 

In 1848, the teacher training college was also moved from Trondenes (near current-day Harstad) to Tromsø, with part of its mission being to educate Sámi scholars - there was a quota ensuring that Sámi gained access. The teacher college was followed by the Tromsø Museum in 1872, and the Mack Brewery in 1877.

During the 19th century, Tromsø became known as the "Paris of the North". How this nickname came into being is uncertain, but the reason is generally assumed to be that people in Tromsø appeared far more sophisticated than visitors from the south typically expected.

Early 1900s: exploration and war

By the end of the 19th century, Tromsø had become a major Arctic trade centre from which many Arctic expeditions originated. Explorers like Roald Amundsen, Umberto Nobile and Fridtjof Nansen made use of the know-how in Tromsø on the conditions in the Arctic, and often recruited their crews in the city.  The Northern lights observatory was founded in 1927.

When Germany invaded Norway in 1940, Tromsø served briefly as the seat of the Norwegian government. General Carl Gustav Fleischer arrived in Tromsø on 10 April 1940 after flying in terrible conditions from Vadsø. From Tromsø he issued orders for total civilian and military mobilisation and declared Northern Norway a theatre of war. Fleischer's strategic plan was to first wipe out the German forces at Narvik and then transfer his division to Nordland to meet a German advance from Trøndelag. The Germans eventually captured all of Norway, after allied support had been withdrawn, although they encountered fierce resistance from the Finnmark-based Alta Battalion at Narvik. Tromsø escaped the war unscathed, although the German battleship Tirpitz was sunk by RAF Avro Lancaster bombers during Operation Catechism off the Tromsøy island on 12 November 1944, killing close to 1,000 German sailors.

At the end of the war, the city received thousands of refugees from Finnmark county and the northern areas of Troms - areas which had been devastated by German forces using scorched earth tactics in expectation of a Red Army offensive.

Late 1900stoday: rapid expansion
Expansion after World War II has been rapid. The rural municipalities of Tromsøysund and Ullsfjord, and most of Hillesøy, were merged with Tromsø on 1 January 1964, creating today's Tromsø municipality and almost tripling Tromsø's population - from 12,430 to 32,664. In addition, the population growth has been strong, with at times more than 1,000 new Tromsøværinger (residents of Tromsø) annually. The population of Tromsø municipality today is 68,239, and the urban area, Norway's ninth most populous, is home to 58,486 people. This excludes most of the city's students, however, who often do not change their address when moving to Tromsø.

A major development was the opening of Tromsø Airport in 1964, situated on the main island, and in 1972 the University of Tromsø was opened, at the time one of four universities in Norway and the only one serving the northern half of the country. A local teacher's college and museum were eventually incorporated into the university. The Norwegian Polar Institute was moved to Tromsø from Oslo in 1998. More recently, the university has expanded further through two mergers, first with University College Tromsø in 2009 and then with University College Finnmark in 2013.

Municipal history
The city of Tromsø was established as an independent municipality on 1 January 1838 (see formannskapsdistrikt law). The city was completely surrounded by the Tromsøe landdistrikt (the rural municipality of Tromsø / later renamed Tromsøysund), but they were governed separately. As the city grew in size, areas were added to the city from the rural district.

On 1 January 1861, an area of Tromsøysund (population: 110) was transferred to the city of Tromsø. On 1 January 1873, an unpopulated area of Tromsøysund was transferred to the city. On 1 July 1915, another area of Tromsøysund (population: 512) was merged into the city of Tromsø. On 1 January 1955, the Bjerkaker area on Tromsøya (population: 1,583) was transferred from Tromsøysund to the city of Tromsø.

During the 1960s, there were many municipal mergers across Norway due to the work of the Schei Committee. On 1 January 1964, the city of Tromsø (population: 12,602), the municipality of Tromsøysund (population: 16,727), most of the municipality of Ullsfjord except for the Svendsby area (population: 2,019), and most of the municipality of Hillesøy except for the parts on the island of Senja (population: 1,316) were all merged to form a new, larger Tromsø Municipality.

On 1 January 2020, the municipality became a part of the newly created Troms og Finnmark county, which replaced the old Troms county.

Coat of arms

The coat of arms (current version) was granted on 22 July 1983, although a variation of these arms has been in use since 1870. The official blazon is "Azure, a reindeer trippant argent". This means the arms have a blue field (background) and the charge is a reindeer. The reindeer has a tincture of argent which means it is commonly colored white, but if it is made out of metal, then silver is used. It is often surmounted by a mural crown with five or four turrets. The municipal authority currently uses a stylised rendering drawn by Hallvard Trætteberg (1898–1987) and adopted by royal resolution on 24 September 1941. The idea for a coat of arms for Tromsø was presented by A. T. Kaltenborn in 1855 and the coat of arms was first used in connection with the Industry and Crafts Exhibition in Tromsø in 1870. Over time, the background colour has been changed between blue and red. At one point it also used a natural landscape in the background. Although reindeer played little or no role in the city, Tromsø was the administrative center of the vast surrounding areas in the county were reindeer herding was common in this part of Northern Norway.

Geography
Tromsø is the 12th largest municipality in Norway with a population of 77,095. The city is home to the world's northernmost university and also houses the northernmost botanical garden and planetarium.

Suburban areas include Kroken, Tromsdalen (on the mainland, east of Tromsøya), the rest of the Tromsøya island, and the eastern part of the large Kvaløya, west of the Tromsøya island. The Tromsø Bridge and Tromsøysund Tunnel both cross the Tromsøysundet strait connecting the mainland with Tromsøya by road. On the western side of the city, the Sandnessund Bridge connects Tromsøya island with Kvaløya island.

There are many tall mountains within the municipality including Hamperokken, Jiehkkevárri, Store Blåmann, Store Fornestinden, and Tromsdalstinden. The Lyngen Alps mountain range lies along the Tromsø-Lyngen municipal border. There are many islands within the municipality of Tromsø including Hillesøya, Kvaløya, Rebbenesøya, Ringvassøya, Sommarøya, and Tromsøya. There are also several fjords that are located in Tromsø including the Balsfjorden, Kaldfjorden, Malangen, and Ullsfjorden.

Climate

Tromsø experiences a boreal climate (Köppen climate classification (Dfc/subarctic) as winter temperatures are just cold enough to qualify and the summer season is short. However, precipitation amount and pattern, with maximum precipitation in autumn and winter, as well as lack of permafrost, are atypical for subarctic areas and more typical for oceanic climates. Owing to the ice-free Norwegian Sea and the westerlies bringing the mild air ashore, winter temperatures in Tromsø are moderate and extremely mild for the latitude.

Summers are rather cool, sometimes cloudy and rainy, and sometimes sunny, often with large variations from year to year and from month to month, giving a completely different experience, all depending on the weather pattern. This variability is also visible in sunhours, which has been recorded since 1961: In July 1980 Tromsø recorded 430 sunhours, which is still the national record for sunniest month ever. However, July 1989 only recorded 91 sunhours. June has ranged from just 58 sunhours in June 2018 to 395 sunhours in June 1971 and also June 2002. Tromsø has also recorded the sunniest spring month in Norway with 381 sunhours in May 2013. Tromsø recorded its first "tropical night" with overnight low  July 30, 2018.

Tromsø has reputation of accumulating a lot of snow in winter, but on the streets of the city ice often prevails, especially in the first half of the winter. Tromsø's snowfall pattern is quite erratic and varies substantially between different winters. Thaws with rain in the polar night mid-winter are not uncommon, which melts or wets existing snow, often followed by chilly windy Arctic blasts, creating dangerous ice driving and walking conditions. It is common to see Tromsø inhabitants walking with spikes in their shoes and almost all cars use studded tires.  The all-time record for snow depth was set on 29 April 1997, when the meteorological station on top of Tromsøya recorded  of snow on the ground. In an average winter, Tromsø sees 160 days with at least  of snow on the ground (1970–2000 average, 100 meters above sea level).

That is extremely mild for a location this far north, as it is about the same as the record cold for the entire state of Florida—about 40 degrees latitude further south. The average date for the last overnight freeze (low below ) in spring is May 17 and average date for first freeze in autumn is October 3 (1981-2010 average) giving a frost-free season of 138 days.
The "midnight sun" is above the horizon from 19 May to 27 July (71 days), and the period with continuous night lasts a bit shorter, polar night from 28 November to 14 January (48 days). The sunniest January (1985) recorded just 9 sunhours, while the sunniest February saw 97 sunhours (2018).

Outside the city, large areas in the municipality are at some altitude and above the treeline with an alpine tundra climate (ET). The islands to the west at the outer seabord are milder in winter like Måsvik, making this part of the municipality a subpolar oceanic climate (Cfc) zone. The average date for first overnight freeze (temperature below  in autumn is October 3 (1981-2010 average).

Recent years have seen warming.

The western part of the municipality has islands facing the Norwegian sea, like Rebbenesøya with the Måsvik station.

Light and darkness

The midnight sun occurs from about 18 May to 26 July, but mountains block the view of it for a few days, meaning that one can see the midnight sun from about 21 May to 21 July. Owing to Tromsø's high latitude, twilight is long, meaning there is no true night between March 27 and September 17.

The sun remains below the horizon during the polar night from about 26 November to 15 January, but due to the mountains, the sun is not visible from 21 November to 21 January. The return of the sun is an occasion for celebration. However, because of the twilight, there is some daylight for a couple of hours even around midwinter, often with bluish light, allowing for normal day/night cycles during the winter. The nights shorten quickly. By 21 February, the sun is above the horizon from 7:45 am to 4:10 pm and, by 1 April, is above the horizon from 5:50 am to 7:50 pm (daylight saving time). However, if one were to include astronomical twilight as "not night", then Tromsø only has 13 hours and 32 minutes of night on the winter solstice.

The combination of snow cover and sunshine often creates intense light conditions from late February until the snow melts in the lowland (usually late April), and sunglasses are essential when skiing. Because of these diametrically different light conditions in winter, Norwegians often divide it into two seasons: Mørketid (polar night) and Seinvinter (late winter).

It is possible to observe the aurora borealis (northern lights) from Tromsø, as northern Norway is located in the auroral zone. As it is always light in the summer, no aurora is visible between late April and mid August. Additionally, due to the coastal location, Tromsø is often subject to cloudy conditions, which prevent aurorae being seen, even if they are present.

Villages
The Tromsø municipality includes these villages:

Cityscape

The compact city centre has the biggest concentration of historic wooden houses north of Trondheim, and they co-exist with modern architecture. The houses date from 1789 to 1904, when building wooden houses was banned in the city centre, as in several other Norwegian cities. The oldest house in Tromsø is Skansen, built in 1789 on the remains of a 13th-century turf rampart.

The Polar Museum, Polarmuseet, situated in a wharf house from 1837, presents Tromsø's past as a centre for Arctic hunting and starting point for Arctic expeditions. Tromsø Cathedral, Norway's only wooden cathedral, built in 1861, is located in the middle of the city, and so is the small Catholic church Vår Frue ("Our Lady"). Northern Europe's oldest cinema still in use, Verdensteatret, was built in 1915–16. The cinema has large wall paintings, made by the local artist Sverre Mack in 1921, which picture scenes from Norwegian folk lore and fairy tales.

The Arctic Cathedral, a modern church built in 1965, is situated on the mainland, facing the sound and city centre. The church, in reality a parish church and not a cathedral, was drawn by Jan Inge Hovig. The Polaria aquarium and experience centre from 1998 is a short walk south from the city centre. The Tromsø Museum is a university museum, presenting culture and nature of North Norway. The museum also displays the Arctic-alpine botanic garden, the world's northernmost botanical garden. The mountain Tromsdalstinden, on the mainland, which is easily spotted from the city centre, is also a major landmark. At the top of Tromsøya is a lake called Prestvannet.

Churches
The Church of Norway has eight parishes within the municipality of Tromsø. It is part of the Tromsø domprosti (arch-deanery) in the Diocese of Nord-Hålogaland.

Government
All municipalities in Norway, including Tromsø, are responsible for primary education (up to tenth grade), outpatient health services, senior citizen services, unemployment and other social services, zoning, economic development, and municipal roads. The municipality is governed by a municipal council of elected representatives, which in turn elect a mayor. The municipality falls under the Nord-Troms District Court and the Hålogaland Court of Appeal.

Municipal council
The municipal council  of Tromsø is made up of 43 representatives that are elected for four year terms. Tromsø introduced so-called "parliamentary rule" in 2011. The Municipal council elects an executive body, byrådet ("the city council"), consisting of six byråder ("city councilors"). In theory, these are equivalent to the cabinet members of a parliamentary government. The party breakdown of the council is as follows:

Mayors
The mayors of Tromsø:

1964-1964: Wictor Robertsen (Ap)
1966-1973: Kåre Nordgård (Ap)
1973-1975: Helge Jacobsen (Ap)
1976-1977: Arne Norgård  (Sp)
1978-1979: Helge Jacobsen (Ap)
1980-1995: Erlend Rian (H)
1995-1999: Alvhild Yttergård (H)
1999-2007: Herman Kristoffersen (Ap)
2007-2011: Arild Hausberg (Ap)
2011-2015: Jens Johan Hjort (H)
2015-2016: Jarle Aarbakke (Ap)
2016-2019: Kristin Røymo (Ap)
2019-present: Gunnar Wilhelmsen (Ap)

Economics

Tromsø is the largest fishing port in Norway. Secondary to fishing, the University of Tromsø is a center for Arctic research. Tourism has exploded as an alternative economic resource in recent decades.

In 2021, the US Navy opened facilities to service American submarines at the port, after undergoing a significant expansion in 2020.

Demographics

More than 100 nationalities are represented in the population. Among the more prominent minorities are the Sami, Russians, and Finns, both the local Kvens (descendants of 19th century Finnish immigrants) and recent immigrants from Finland proper. The world's northernmost mosque is to be found in Tromsø. Our Lady Catholic church is the seat of the world's northernmost Catholic Bishop, who leads the Roman Catholic Territorial Prelature of Tromsø. Although the local Catholic population is only 350 strong, Pope John Paul II visited this small church and stayed as a guest of the bishop in 1989.

Sami population
As noted in the history section, the Tromsø area has long been a home to Sámi culture. The assimilation of the Coastal Sámi, however, led to the local Sámi culture becoming increasingly invisible in the Tromsø area during the 20th century. Today there is a Sami kindergarten and Sami language classes in certain schools of Tromsø. There have been attempts at countering the decline of the Sámi language through the establishment of a Sami language centre in Ullsfjord.

The city of Tromsø has generally displayed a positive attitude to the indigenous minority culture. For example, the municipality has arranged the Sámi People's Day; signs at the university are bilingual; and when the city made its bid for the Winter Olympics the Sámi name of Tromsø, Romsa, was included in the proposed logo for the event along with a traditional Sámi symbol as its main visual element.

2011 language controversy
In 2011, the role of Sámi culture in Tromsø became controversial. The Municipal Board had applied for Tromsø to join the Sámi Language Administrative Area. This would have entailed giving equal space to selected Sámi toponyms on signposts, allowing Sámi-speakers to communicate in their language with local authorities, and making means available from the Sámi Parliament for officials to learn Sámi. Political parties, such as the FrP, Venstre and Høyre, opposed the decision and made it a part of their election campaign to reverse it, claiming that, as "a Norwegian city", Tromsø was not required to display Sámi toponyms along with Norwegian ones, or make Sámi an official language along with Norwegian. The parties opposing a larger role for Sámi culture in Tromsø won the election and reversed the application. It has been claimed that the issue has "divided" Tromsø's inhabitants between those who see Sámi culture as naturally belonging there and those who see it as alien to the area. During and after the election campaign, pro-Sámi politicians received threats and people wearing traditional Sámi garb claim to have been subjected to verbal abuse. In June 2013 the municipality nonetheless entered into a cooperation agreement with the Sámi Parliament which is intended to strengthen Sami language education and Sami culture in Tromsø.

Culture

Being the largest city in Northern Norway, Tromsø is a cultural centre for its region. It gained some international attention when on 11 June 2005 hosted one of six 46664 concerts, designed to put work concerning HIV/AIDS on the international agenda. Torbjørn Brundtland and Svein Berge of the electronica duo Röyksopp and Lene Marlin grew up and started their careers in Tromsø.

Many cultural activities take place in Kulturhuset (. the culture house), including concerts by the Norwegian Arctic Philharmonic Orchestra and plays by Tromsø's professional theatre troupe, Hålogaland Teater. The new theatre building was opened in November 2005. The city contains several museums. The largest are the Northern Norwegian Art Gallery (Nordnorsk Kunstmuseum) and the Tromsø Gallery of Contemporary Art (Tromsø Kunstforening).

The Tromsø techno scene is the origin of many of Norway's most important artists in electronic music, and Tromsø was a leading city at the early stages of the house and techno scene in Norway in the late 1980s. Röyksopp and the ambient electronic musician Geir Jennsen, known as Biosphere, are both from the town.

The local newspapers are Bladet Tromsø and Nordlys.

The Arctic Council has its headquarters in Tromsø.

Festivals and celebrations
Both the Tromsø International Film Festival and Nordlysfestivalen (lit. 'the Aurora Borealis Festival'), a classical music festival, are arranged in January. The end of that month is marked by the 'Day of the Sun' (Soldagen), when the sun finally appears above the horizon after the Polar Night, which is celebrated, mainly by children. The International Day of the Sami People is celebrated at the University of Tromsø and the city hall on 6 February every year. Tromsø's Latin American Festival, No Siesta Fiesta, is held at the end of February. It started in 2007 and showcases "the best of Latin America" in Northern Norway with film, dance, music, art, seminars, debates, markets, and a street Samba parade. Every autumn the Insomnia Festival for electronic music is hosted. It is one of the largest and most important festivals for electronic music and techno culture in Norway.

The Bukta Tromsø Open Air Festival, held in June and July, is a popular music festival. The Bukta festival is mainly a rock festival, but also features other kinds of modern music. The festival takes place in Telegrafbukta, a park on the south-western part of the Tromsøya island. Other popular cultural summer events among the population of Tromsø is the Karlsøy festival and the Riddu Riddu festival, both held in the region surrounding the city.

Sports

Tromsø is the home of many football clubs, of which the three most prominent are Tromsø IL, which plays in the Norwegian Premier League and is the world's northernmost Premier League football team, I.F. Fløya in the Norwegian First Division (women), and Tromsdalen U.I.L., playing in the Adeccoliga. Tromsø Midnight Sun Marathon is arranged every year in June and recently also a Polar Night Halfmarathon in January. The city is home to many clubs in the top division in various sports. Most notably basketball-outfit Tromsø Storm in the BLNO, BK Tromsø in the top volleyball league for men, and Tromsø Volley in the top volleyball league for women. The oldest sports club in Tromsø is Tromsø Turnforening, a gymnastics club founded in 1862, that also was the cradle of the before mentioned football club Tromsø IL.

Tromsø was selected by the Norwegian National Olympic Committee as Norway's candidate for the 2018 Winter Olympics. This would have made Tromsø the first city north of the Arctic Circle to host the games. There were plans to use ships as the media village. In October 2008 the NOC suspended Tromsø's bid, citing excessive costs. From the southern to the northern tip of the island Tromsøya, there is a floodlit cross-country ski track. A ski jump is also situated on the island, close to the university. As of the spring in 2010, the city's first ice hockey arena has been open and is home to Tromsø Hockey, which plays in the Swedish Ice Hockey Association's League 3. Tromsø is also home to the most northern tennis club in Norway.

Notable residents

Public servants 

 Johannes Steen (1827–1906) a Norwegian educator and politician, Mayor of Tromsø (1856-1862) and Prime Minister of Norway 1891-1893
 Oscar Nissen (1843–1911) a Norwegian physician, newspaper editor and politician
 Paul Steenstrup Koht (1844–1892) a Norwegian educator and politician, city mayor and MP
 Hans Jacob Horst (1848–1931) a Norwegian politician and a member of the International Court of Arbitration (1906-1929) and a member of the Norwegian Nobel Committee (1903-1931)
 Just Knud Qvigstad (1853–1957) a philologist, linguist, ethnographer, cultural historian, headmaster, politician and Mayor of Tromsø
 Dorothea Schjoldager (1853–1938) a feminist proponent for women's rights, school teacher and social worker
 James Trane (1857–1936) a Norwegian-American inventor & industrialist, co-founded Trane
 Einar Hoidale (1870–1952) lawyer, newspaper editor and politician from Minnesota
 Arnold Holmboe (1873–1956) a Norwegian politician for the Liberal Party and Mayor of Tromsø
 Halvdan Koht (1873–1965) historian, politician and former head of the Ministry of Foreign Affairs
 Kirsten Sand (1895–1996) first fully technically qualified female Norwegian architect
 Einar Johansen (1915–1996) an engineer and decorated resistance member during WW II
 Martin Siem (1915–1996) a businessperson and WWII resistance member
 Daniel Carleton Gajdusek (1923–2008) an American physician and medical researcher, co-recipient of the Nobel Prize in Physiology or Medicine for work on prion disease
 Hermod Skånland (1925–2011) an economist and Governor of the Central Bank of Norway 1985 to 1993
 Gerd Fleischer (born 1942) a human rights activist
 Svein Ludvigsen (born 1946) a Norwegian former politician and a convicted sex offender
 Mads Gilbert (born 1947) a Norwegian physician, humanitarian, activist and politician
 Hermann Kristoffersen (born 1947) a former long-serving Mayor of Tromsø, known as Red Hermann
 Hans-Tore Bjerkaas (born 1951) a former Director-General of the Norwegian Broadcasting Corporation

The arts 

 Jorgen Dreyer (1877–1948) an American sculptor of monuments, emigrated in 1903
 Cora Sandel (1880–1974) a Norwegian writer and painter
 Peter Wessel Zapffe (1899–1990) a metaphysician, author, lawyer and mountaineer
 Lars Berg (1901–1969) a Norwegian teacher, novelist, short story writer and playwright
 Egil Rasmussen (1903–1964) an author, literature critic and pianist; grew up in Tromsø
 Kristian Kristiansen (1909–1980) a novelist, playwright and writer of short stories
 Rønnaug Alten (1910–2001) a Norwegian actress and stage instructor
 Yngvar Ustvedt (1928–2007) a writer, biographer, critic and radio personality
 Per Bronken (1935–2002) a poet, novelist, actor, film director and stage producer
 Arthur Arntzen (born 1937) a Norwegian journalist, humorist, actor and writer
 Kirsti Sparboe (born 1946) a Norwegian musical performer and an actress
 Jorun Thørring (born 1955) a specialist in gynaecology, and author
 Steinar Albrigtsen (born 1957 in Hammerfest) guitarist, songwriter and singercomp
 Geir Jenssen (born 1962) a Norwegian electronic musician, stage name Biosphere
The Pussycats (band 1964), pop, rock
Erik Skjoldbjærg (born 1964) a Norwegian writer and film director
 Helge Andreas Norbakken (born 1965) a Norwegian drummer
 Tobben & Ero (duo 1969) pop, rockr-wrig,
Anneli Drecker (born 1969) a Norwegian singer and actress, frontwoman for Bel Canto
 Dag-Are Haugan (born 1970) musician with the group Alog
 Espen Lind (born 1971) a record producer, songwriter, singer, and multi-instrumentalist
 Espen Sommer Eide (born 1972) a Norwegian composer and musician with Alog
 Thomas Thormodsæter Haugen (born 1974) stage name Samoth, multi-instrumentalist in the black metal band Emperor
 Lisa Stokke (born 1975) a Norwegian actor and singer
 Svein Berge (born 1976) and Torbjørn Brundtland (born 1975) musicians in the duo Röyksopp
 Ewa Da Cruz (born 1976) a Norwegian-American television, soap opera and film actress
 Lene Marlin (born 1980) a Norwegian singer-songwriter and musician
 Dagny Norvoll Sandvik (born 1990) a Norwegian singer, pop musician and songwriter

Sport 

 Per-Mathias Høgmo (born 1959) a football manager, former manager of both the men and women's national football teams
 Bjørn Johansen (born 1969) a former Norwegian footballer with over 400 club caps
 Roger Nilsen (born 1969) a football coach and former player, 329 club caps and 32 for Norway 
 Bjarte Engen Vik (born 1971) a former Norwegian Nordic combined athlete; multiple medallist at the 1994 and 1998 Winter Olympics 
 Ole Martin Årst (born 1974) retired footballer, grew up in Tromsø, 414 club caps, 22 for Norway 
 Ailo Gaup (born 1979) a former Norwegian Freestyle Motocross rider, invented the Underflip
 Morten Giæver (born 1982) a Norwegian football midfielder with over 430 club caps, brought up in Tromsø
 Ruben Yttergård Jenssen (born 1988) a Norwegian footballer with over 350 club caps and 39 for Norway 
 Nikolai Schirmer (born 1991) a Norwegian freeride skier
 Vilde Nilsen (born 2001) a female Paralympic cross-country skier and biathlete, team silver medallist at the 2018 Winter Paralympics
 and
 Elling Carlsen (1819–1900) a Norwegian skipper, seal hunter and explorer
 Richard With (1846–1930) a Norwegian ship's captain, businessman and politician
 Henry Rudi (1889–1970) a Norwegian trapper and polar bear hunter

Twin towns – sister cities

Tromsø is twinned with:

 Anchorage, United States (1969)
 Arkhangelsk, Russia (2011)
 Gaza City, Palestine (2001)
 Kemi, Finland (1940)
 Luleå, Sweden (1950)
 Murmansk, Russia (1972)
 Quetzaltenango, Guatemala (1999)
 Zagreb, Croatia (1971)

Notes

References

External links
Municipal fact sheet from Statistics Norway 

 
 
 Tromsø Municipal Council

 
Municipalities of Troms og Finnmark
1838 establishments in Norway
Populated coastal places in Norway
Populated places of Arctic Norway
Ski areas and resorts in Norway